New Mill is a Grade II* listed smock mill in Hythe Road, Willesborough, Ashford, Kent. It stands just west of junction 10 of the M20 motorway. It was built in 1869 and is now a museum open to the public.

History

New Mill was built in 1869 by John Hill, the Ashford millwright, replacing an earlier smock mill. The mill was worked by the Cornes family until the First World War, and by the Manwaring family from 1920 until 1938 when the mill last worked by wind. The mill was then sold to T Denne and Sons and used for storage. The fantail was sold to Barham mill in 1946 and installed on that mill. In 1969 the mill was bought by Tom Robbins and remained in his ownership until it was bought, in a very dilapidated state, and fully restored in 1991 to its former glory by Ashford Borough Council for the benefit of the citizens of Ashford and the public at large.

The mill makes its own stoneground wholemeal bread flour, turning one set of stones with the power of a  Hornsby engine. The mill, with its neighbouring barn, is licensed for weddings, Christenings, (civil ceremonies) and many other meetings and functions. The Mill complex is open from April to the end of September on Saturdays, Sundays and Bank Holiday Mondays from 2pm to 5pm. School and group visits can be arranged for weekdays.

In 2006 the mill was awarded a Heritage Lottery Grant which enabled the replacement of the sails. The new sails were fitted on 13 April 2007. Part of the grant was spent on producing an Education pack for use on school visits.  The windmill is now fully operational and able to mill flour using wind or the engine. The mill is licensed to hold wedding ceremonies.

Norman Museum
Norman Cycles was a bicycle, autocycle, moped, and motorcycle manufacturer based in Ashford, and the mill's barn complex houses the Norman Museum, where they have some mopeds and bicycles on display. The Norman Cycles Club is based at the Windmill.

Description

New Mill is a four-storey smock mill on a two-storey brick base with an attached miller's cottage. It has four patent sails carried on a cast-iron windshaft. It drives four pairs of millstones by wind, with a fifth pair powered by an auxiliary engine. This was a steam engine until 1911, then an oil engine and latterly an electric motor. The Brake Wheel is of composite construction, with an iron centre and wooden rim. This drives a cast-iron Wallower on the Upright Shaft, which carries a cast-iron Great Spur Wheel, which drives the millstones overdrift.

Millers

Cornes & Son 1869 - 1918
Thomas Sellins 1869 - 1904
John Cobb 1904 - 1940
William Manwaring 1920 - 1938
Cecil Coltham 1931- 1940
T Denne & Sons 1938 - 1969
Cecil Coltham 1957 - 1968

References for above:-

References

External links
Windmill World page on the mill.

Windmills in Kent
History of Ashford, Kent
Smock mills in England
Tourist attractions in Kent
Grade II* listed buildings in Kent
Windmills completed in 1869
Museums in the Borough of Ashford
Mill museums in England
Transport museums in England
Motorcycle museums in the United Kingdom
Ashford, Kent
Octagonal buildings in the United Kingdom
1869 establishments in England